Peggy Jane Rea (March 31, 1921 – February 5, 2011) was an American actress known for her many roles in television, often playing matronly characters.

Life and career
Before she became an actress, Rea left UCLA to attend business school. She landed a job as a production secretary at Metro-Goldwyn-Mayer in the 1940s. Later, she was an assistant to writer-musician Kay Thompson until Thompson dropped her in April 1948. Some of the points of discord apparently included Rea's insistence on staying at the Algonquin Hotel (rather than Essex House, where Thompson was staying), and disappearing, on at least one occasion, on the eve of their New York opening to see Born Yesterday on Broadway without telling Thompson. Although Thompson severed ties with Rea, the younger woman kept in touch with other members of Thompson's family, including Thompson's mother, brother and younger sister, with whom she enjoyed cordial relations. Rea quickly landed on her feet with a supporting role in the National Road Company production of Tennessee Williams' A Streetcar Named Desire (as Eunice Hubbell, 1948–1949) starring Anthony Quinn.

She appeared in such television shows as I Love Lucy, The Wild Wild West, Hazel, Bonanza, Have Gun Will Travel, Gunsmoke, Sergeant Bilko, Ironside, Burke's Law, Marcus Welby, M.D., All In The Family, Maude, Hunter, The Odd Couple, Gidget, Busting Loose, MacGyver, and The Golden Girls.

She appeared in feature films, including Norman Lear's Cold Turkey and In Country.

Rea is probably best known for her role as Lulu Coltrane Hogg in The Dukes of Hazzard (1979). Throughout the series' nine-year run Rea appeared in 19 episodes as the wife of Hazzard County Commissioner Jefferson Davis "Boss" Hogg (played by Sorrell Booke).

After portraying a landlady in an earlier episode of The Waltons, Rea permanently joined the cast in 1979 in the role of Rose Burton, a cousin of Olivia Walton, a surrogate parental figure replacing Ellen Corby (Grandma), Michael Learned (Olivia), and the following year, Ralph Waite (John).

Rea remained with the series until the spring of 1981 when her character of Rose was proposed to by her beau Stanley Perkins (played by William Schallert) shortly before the show's cancellation. Rea's character of Rose appeared in the Walton's Thanksgiving Reunion in 1993. Rea later appeared as a regular on the first season of Step By Step from 1991 to 1992 and Grace Under Fire during the 1990s.

Credits
Her recurring roles included: 
Clubwoman and Nurse I Love Lucy (recurring various roles) 
The Red Skelton Show 1966–1971
 Peggy on Have Gun Will Travel (8 episodes)
 Mrs. Roniger and other roles on Gunsmoke 1962–1971
 Cousin Bertha on All in the Family
 Martha Burkhorn on All in the Family
 Rose Burton on The Waltons
 Lulu Hogg on The Dukes of Hazzard 1979–1985
 Ivy Baker on Step by Step 1991–1992
 Jean Kelly on Grace Under Fire 1993–1998 (51 episodes)

Death
Rea died in Toluca Lake, California, aged 89, from complications of heart failure on February 5, 2011.

Filmography

References

External links

1921 births
2011 deaths
Actresses from Los Angeles
American film actresses
American television actresses
20th-century American actresses
Burials at Santa Barbara Cemetery
21st-century American women
The Waltons